Augustus Moulton (born 25 December 1959) is a Liberian sprinter. He competed in the men's 200 metres at the 1984 Summer Olympics.

References

1959 births
Living people
Athletes (track and field) at the 1984 Summer Olympics
Liberian male sprinters
Olympic athletes of Liberia
Place of birth missing (living people)